Tollycraft was an American powerboat manufacturer in business from 1936 to 1997.

History
Tollycraft was founded in 1936 as a wooden boat builder by Robert Merland Tollefson (better known as Tolly).  In 1962 the company switched to building its boats from fiberglass.  Tollefson sold the company in 1987, and it was bankrupt by 1993.  Although it attempted to resume operations, the company went out of business in 1997.  

Tollycraft was known to make high-quality boats ideally suited to the waters of its home in the Pacific Northwest.

References
 Robert M. Lane,  "Tollycraft: Family, Friends, Boats", Passagemaker, Nov. 2005, pg. 154. 
 Bruce Ramsey, "Tollycraft: What The Have-Knots Have- Shipbuilder's Yachts Ride Wave Of Popularity - And Of Profitability", Seattle Post-Intelligencer, January 27, 1989, Sec. Business, Pg. B1.
 Richard Thiel, "North Star 71 Pilothouse Motoryacht— Design Odyssey", Power and Motoryacht, July 2000, Online version

External links 
www.Tollycraft.net  (Bad Link)
Northwest Yachting: Tolly Tollefson
Tollycraft Boating Club

American boat builders
Vehicle manufacturing companies established in 1936
Vehicle manufacturing companies disestablished in 1997
1936 establishments in Washington (state)
1997 disestablishments in Washington (state)
Defunct manufacturing companies based in Washington (state)